The Union of Soviet Socialist Republics made its Winter Paralympic début at the 1988 Winter Paralympics in Innsbruck, Austria. This was also the last appearance of the Soviet Union in the Winter Paralympics before the union's dissolution. The country was represented by eight athletes, who all completed in cross-country skiing. Valentina Grigoryeva won the USSR's only medals: two bronze.

Medallists

Bronze
 Valentina Grigoryeva - cross-country skiing, women's 10km B1
 Valentina Grigoryeva - cross-country skiing, women's 5km B1

See also
1988 Winter Paralympics
Soviet Union at the Paralympics
Soviet Union at the 1988 Winter Olympics

References

External links
International Paralympic Committee

Nations at the 1988 Winter Paralympics
1988
Paralympics